In geometry, an Archimedean circle is any circle constructed from an arbelos that has the same radius as each of Archimedes' twin circles.  If the arbelos is normed such that the diameter of its outer (largest) half circle has a length of 1 and r denotes the radiius of any of the inner half circles, then the radius ρ of such an Archimedean circle is given by

There are over fifty different known ways to construct Archimedean circles.

Origin

An Archimedean circle was first constructed by Archimedes in his Book of Lemmas. In his book, he constructed what is now known as Archimedes' twin circles.

Radius

This radius is thus .

The Archimedean circle with center  (as in the figure at right) is tangent to the tangents from the centers of the small semicircles to the other small semicircle.

Other Archimedean circles finders

Leon Bankoff
Leon Bankoff constructed other Archimedean circles called Bankoff's triplet circle and Bankoff's quadruplet circle.

Thomas Schoch
In 1978 Thomas Schoch found a dozen more Archimedean circles (the Schoch circles) that have been published in 1998. He also constructed what is known as the Schoch line.

Peter Y. Woo
Peter Y. Woo considered the Schoch line, and with it, he was able to create a family of infinitely many Archimedean circles known as the Woo circles.

Frank Power
In the summer of 1998, Frank Power introduced four more Archimedes circles known as Archimedes' quadruplets.

Archimedean circles in Wasan geometry (Japanese geometry)
In 1831, Nagata (永田岩三郎遵道) proposed a sangaku problem involving two Archimedean circles, which are denoted by W6 and W7 in [3]. 
In 1853, Ootoba (大鳥羽源吉守敬) proposed a sangaku problem involving an Archimedean circle.

References

Arbelos
Geometric shapes
Circle packing